The weightlifting competitions at the 2013 Mediterranean Games in Mersin took place between 21 June and 26 June at the Erdemli Sports Hall.

Athletes competed in 28 events across 14 weight categories (7 for men and 7 for women). Men's +105 kg category will not be held because too few nations applied.

Medal summary

Men's events

Women's events

Medal table
Key:

References

 
2013 in weightlifting
2013
Sports at the 2013 Mediterranean Games
International weightlifting competitions hosted by Turkey